Derrida and Husserl: The Basic Problem of Phenomenology is a 2002 book by Leonard Lawlor. It examines French philosopher Jacques Derrida's interpretation of German philosopher Edmund Husserl.

Structure 
Derrida and Husserl contains four parts and eight chapters, followed by an afterword ("The Final Idea: Memory and Life"):

Part One: Phenomenology and Ontology

Genesis as the Basic Problem of Phenomenology

The Critique of Phenomenology: An Investigation of "'Genesis and Structure' and Phenomenology"

The Critique of Ontology: An Investigation of "The Ends of Man"

Part Two: The "Originary Dialectic" of Phenomenology and Ontology

Upping the Ante on Dialectic: An Investigation of Le Problème de la genèse dans la philosophie de Husserl

The Root, That Is Necessarily One, of Every Dilemma: An Investigation of the Introduction to Husserl's "The Origin of Geometry"

Part Three: The End of Phenomenology and Ontology

More Metaphysical Than Metaphysics: An Investigation of "Violence and Metaphysics"

The Test of the Sign: An Investigation of Voice and Phenomenon

Part Four: The Turn in Derrida

Looking for Noon at Two O'Clock: An Investigation of Specters of Marx

Reception 
Kas Saghafi referred to Derrida and Husserl as the "first detailed and comprehensive examination of all of Derrida's major writings on Husserl". He praised Lawlor as "meticulously unpacking and elucidating works that 40 or 50 years after their publication still prove forbiddingly difficult."

References 

2002 non-fiction books
American non-fiction books
Books about philosophers
English-language books
Works about Edmund Husserl
Works about Jacques Derrida